The National Basketball League (NBL) was a professional basketball league in Japan run by the Japan Basketball Association (JBA). The first NBL season started in Autumn 2013, replacing the JBA's previous top-flight league, the Japan Basketball League. Below the NBL was the National Basketball Development League (NBDL), which was the successor to the former JBL 2 division.

The NBL and its predecessor existed alongside the bj league, an independent league based on the American sports franchise model that had been active since 2005. The JBA was suspended by FIBA in November 2014 for failing to address the fragmentation of the sport into competing leagues. As a condition of FIBA lifting the suspension in August 2015, the NBL and NBDL merged with the bj-league to form the B.League, which will commence in October 2016. Accordingly, the 2015-16 NBL season was the league's third and final season.

Teams 
The league's initial season in 2013-14 consisted of twelve teams. The eight teams that participated in the final season of the JBL1 joined the league, as well as the JBL2 champion Hyogo Storks. The Chiba Jets returned to the JBA system after playing two seasons in the bj-league, including a 9th-place finish in 2012-13.  intended to join the NBL after finishing third in their first JBL2 season in 2012-13, but subsequent financial difficulties saw them withdraw their application. They were replaced by the newly formed Tsukuba Robots, who submitted a separate application for entry to the league. The twelfth team to join the league was the Kumamoto Volters, who had been seeking entrance into the JBL2 since 2009. Three NBDL teams were given associate membership status, allowing for the possibility of their future promotion to the NBL. However, all three teams (Renova Kagoshima, Tokyo Excellence and Toyota Tsusho Fighting Eagles) ultimately remained in the NBDL for the duration of the competition's existence.

The 2014-15 season saw the Hiroshima Dragonflies enter the league as an expansion team and the Tsukuba Robots transfer from the Western Conference to the Eastern Conference. The Wakayama Trians, who were runners up in the league's first season, withdrew midway through the 2014-15 season in January 2015 due to financial difficulty and were refused entry into the 2015-2016 season. In March 2014 the league issued a public call for expansion teams to join the NBL or NBDL for the 2015-16 season. The Tokyo Hachioji Trains joined the NBDL but the NBL remained at twelve teams. The league abandoned the two-conference system in 2015-16, with teams instead playing five matches against each other for a total 55-game regular season.

Playoff champions

All-star game

References

Basketball leagues in Japan
Defunct basketball leagues
Sports leagues established in 2013
Recurring sporting events disestablished in 2016
2013 establishments in Japan
2016 disestablishments in Japan
Defunct sports leagues in Japan